The Evanston Towers are a historic apartment building located at 554–602 Sheridan Square in Evanston, Illinois.  It was built in 1924 and designed by Anthony H. Quitsow. The "E"-shaped building was designed in the Tudor Revival style and has two courtyards, a crenelated tower on the north side, entrances with Tudor arches, and limestone decorations. Early advertising for the apartments billed them as "among the finest in Evanston" due to the building's design, amenities, and views of Lake Michigan.

The building was added to the National Register of Historic Places on March 15, 1984.

References

Residential buildings completed in 1924
Buildings and structures on the National Register of Historic Places in Cook County, Illinois
Buildings and structures in Evanston, Illinois
Tudor Revival architecture in Illinois
Residential buildings on the National Register of Historic Places in Illinois